Tore Sandvik (born 30 May 1972) is a Norwegian orienteering competitor and World champion. He won a gold medal in the 1999 World Orienteering Championships in Inverness with the Norwegian Relay team.

International results
Sandvik won two silver medals in the 2001 World Orienteering Championships in Tampere. He finished overall second in the 2000 World Cup. He received a gold medal (relay) and a silver medal in the 2001 World Games, and earned a silver medal in the 2000 European Championships.

Club and national results
Sandvik is a member of the club Halden SK. He has eight victories in Tiomila (1998, 1999, 2000, 2002, 2003, 2004, 2006, 2007), and four victories in the Jukola relay (1995, 1998, 2000, 2003). Eighteen medals in national championships, including six gold medals.

References

External links
 
 

1972 births
Living people
Norwegian orienteers
Male orienteers
Foot orienteers
World Orienteering Championships medalists
Competitors at the 2001 World Games
World Games gold medalists
World Games silver medalists
World Games medalists in orienteering
Junior World Orienteering Championships medalists